Fortaleza (locally , Portuguese for Fortress) is the state capital of Ceará, located in Northeastern Brazil. It is Brazil's 5th largest city, with a population of slightly over 2.7 million, and the 12th largest city by gross domestic product. It forms the core of the Fortaleza metropolitan area, which is home to over 4.1 million people. 

Fortaleza is an important industrial and commercial center of Northeast Brazil. According to the Ministry of Tourism, it is the fourth most visited city and tourist destination in the country. The BR-116, the most important highway of the country, starts in Fortaleza. The municipality is part of the Mercosur common market, and vital trade port which is closest to mainland Europe, being  from Lisbon, Portugal.

To the north of the city lies the Atlantic Ocean; to the south are the municipalities of Pacatuba, Eusébio, Maracanaú and Itaitinga; to the east is the municipality of Aquiraz and the Atlantic Ocean; and to the west is the municipality of Caucaia. Residents of the city are known as Fortalezenses. Fortaleza, along with Recife and Salvador, is a considered one of the primate cities of Northeast Region.

History

Colonial period

Colonisation began in 1603 when Portugal was part of the Iberian Union, when the Portuguese Pero Coelho de Souza constructed the Fort of São Tiago and founded the settlement of Nova Lisboa (New Lisbon). After a victory over the French in 1612, Martins Soares Moreno expanded the Fort of São Tiago and changed its name to Forte de São Sebastião.

In 1630 the Dutch invaded the Brazilian Northeast and in 1637 they took the Fort of São Sebastião and ruled over Ceará. In battles with the Portuguese and natives in 1644 the fort was destroyed. Under captain Matthias Beck the Dutch West Indies Company built a new fortress by the banks of river Pajeú. Fort Schoonenborch ("graceful stronghold") officially opened on August 19, 1649. After the capitulation of Pernambuco in 1654, the Dutch handed over this fortress to the Portuguese, who renamed it Fortaleza da Nossa Senhora de Assunção ("Fort of Our Lady of the Assumption"), after which the city of Fortaleza takes its name.

Fortaleza was officially founded as a village 1726, becoming the capital of Ceará state in 1799.

Imperial period
During the 19th century, Fortaleza was consolidated as an urban centre in Ceará, supported by the cotton industry. With the transformation of the city into a regional export center and with the increase of direct navigation to Europe, the customs building of Fortaleza was built in 1812. In 1824, the city was targeted by the revolutionaries of Confederation of the Equator.

Republican period

The city gained a number of new districts in the 1930s, including Messejana and Porangaba.
In 1954, the first university in the city was created, the Universidade Federal do Ceará (UFC).

In 1983 the city started to integrate the territory of the new city of Maracanaú, which, just some years ago, was made again part of the Greater Fortaleza (the city's Metropolitan area). In the 1980s, Fortaleza exceeded Recife in population terms, becoming the second most populous city in Northeastern Brazil, with 2,571,896 inhabitants.

Geography

Climate
Fortaleza has a typical tropical climate, specifically a tropical wet and dry climate (Köppen climate classification: Aw/As), with high temperatures and relative humidity throughout the year. However, these conditions are usually relieved by pleasant winds blowing from the ocean. Average temperatures are not much different throughout the year. The rainy season spans from January to July, with rainfall particularly prodigious in March and April. There is usually rain during the first seven months of the year from January to July. During this period, relative humidity is high. Fortaleza's climate is usually very dry from August to December, with very little rainfall.

Rainfall is like all of Northeastern Brazil among the most variable in the world, comparable (for similar average annual rainfalls) to central Queensland cities like Townsville and Mackay. In the notorious drought year of 1877 as little as  fell, and in 1958 only , but in the Nordeste's record wet year of 1985 Fortaleza received .

Vegetation
In Fortaleza there are some remaining areas of mangrove in preserved areas, including Cocó Park.
Ten miles offshore is the Pedra da Risca do Meio Marine State Park, created in 1997 to protect the reefs.

Ecology and environment

The vegetation of Fortaleza is typically coastal. The restinga areas are found in dune regions near the mouths of the Ceará, Cocó and Pacoti rivers, in the beds of which there is still a mangrove forest. In other green areas of the city, there is no longer native vegetation, consisting of varied vegetation, fruit trees more commonly.  The city is home to seven environmental conservation units. These are the Sabiaguaba Dunes Municipal Natural Park, the Sabiaguaba Environmental Protection Area, the Maraponga Lagoon Ecological Park, the Cocó Ecological Park, the Ceará River Estuary Environmental Protection Area, the Environmental Protection Area of the Rio Pacoti and the Pedra da Risca do Meio Marine State Park.  There is also, in the city, the Area of Relevant Ecological Interest of Sírio Curió, that protects the last enclave of Atlantic Forest in the urban zone.

The Cocó River is part of the river basin of the east coast of Ceará and has a total length of about 50 km in its main area. The park is inserted in the area of greater environmental sensitivity of the city, where it is possible to identify geoenvironmental formations such as coastal plain, fluvial plain and surface of the coastal trays. The Cocó river mangrove is home to mollusks, crustaceans, fish, reptiles, birds and mammals. The park has a structure of visitation, with guides, ecological trails and equipment and events of environmental education and ecotourism. The Coaçu River, affluent of the river Cocó, forms in its bed the lagoon of the Precabura.

The Rio Pacoti provides much of the water supply for Fortaleza.  At the municipal boundary with Caucaia, the estuary of the Rio Ceará is covered by an environmental protection area (APA), which was set up in 1999.

Demographics

According to the 2010 IBGE Census, there were 2,315,116 people residing in the city of Fortaleza. The census revealed the following numbers: 1,403,292 Pardo (multiracial) people (57.2%), 901,816 White people (36.8%), 110,811 Black people (4.5%), 33,161 Asian people (1.4%), 3,071 Amerindian people (0.1%).

In 2010, the city of Fortaleza was the 5th most populous city proper in Brazil, after São Paulo, Rio de Janeiro, Salvador, and Brasília.

In 2010, the city had 433,942 opposite-sex couples and 1,559 same-sex couples. The population of Fortaleza was 53.2% female and 46.8% male.

The following cities are included in the metropolitan area of Fortaleza (ordered by population): Fortaleza, Caucaia, Maracanaú, Maranguape, Aquiraz, Pacatuba, Pacajus, Horizonte, São Gonçalo do Amarante, Itatinga, Guaiúba and Chorozinho.

According to a genetic study from 2011, 'pardos' and whites' from Fortaleza, which comprise the largest share of the population, showed European ancestry of about 70%, the rest divided between Native American and African ancestries. A 2015 study, however, found out the following composition in Fortaleza: 48,9% of European contribution, 35,4% of Native American input and 15,7% of African ancestry.

Religion

The prevailing religion of Fortaleza is the Roman Catholic branch of Christianity.

Source: IBGE 2000. 

According to the census of 2010, 1,664,521 people, 67.88% of the population, followed Roman Catholicism, 523,456 (21.35%) were Protestant, 31,691 (1.29%) represented Spiritism and 162,985 (6.65%) had no religion whatsoever. Other religions, such as Umbanda, Candomblé, other Afro-Brazilian religions, Spiritualism, Judaism, Hinduism, Buddhism, Islam, other Eastern religions, Esotericism and other Christian churches like the Church of Jesus Christ of Latter-day Saints had a smaller number of adherents.

Politics

The administration of the municipality is made from the executive and legislative branches. Roberto Cláudio, of the PDT, won 650,607 votes in the 2012 election, and was elected mayor. Legislative power rests with the City Council of Fortaleza, composed of 43 city councilors, elected for four-year terms, responsible for drafting municipal laws and supervising the executive. The municipality is, in addition, governed by organic law. In January 2015, there were 1 659 091 voters in Fortaleza (26,457% of the total state), distributed in thirteen electoral zones. The number of persons directly and indirectly employed in the municipal public administration in 2013 was respectively 31 318 and 4 950.

The city also houses the seat of state executive power, the Abolition Palace, occupied by governor Camilo Santana, of the PT, elected in the general elections in Brazil in 2014. historically headquarters of the Iracema Club, which was Ceded to the Municipal Hall and now houses municipal executive bodies. In the city, there is the Administrative Center Governor Virgílio Távora.

Among the institutions present in the city, are the Fortaleza Air Base, the Port Authority of Ceará, School of Apprentice Sailors of Ceará and the Command of the Tenth Military Region. The city also has units of the International Committee of the Red Cross and UNICEF. Since 1996, a city is part of the Common Market of Cities of Mercosur.

Economy

At the beginning of the decade of 2000, among the capitals of the Northeast, Fortaleza had the third largest Gross Domestic Product (GDP), being surpassed by Recife and Salvador. In 2012, the GDP of Fortaleza reached the value of 43.4 billion Reais, the tenth highest of the country. In the same year, the value of taxes on products net of subsidies at current prices was R $6,612,822,000 and the municipality's GDP per capita was R$17.359,53. The city's booming economy is reflected in purchasing power, the country's eighth largest, with estimated consumption potential at 42 billion reais in 2014.

The main economic source of the municipality is centered in the tertiary sector, with its diversified segments of commerce and service rendering. Next, the secondary sector stands out, with the industrial complexes. In 2012, the city had 873,746 people in employment.

Culture

According to the Master Plan of Fortaleza, the Special Areas for the Preservation of Historic, Cultural and Archaeological Heritage are the regions of the center, Parangaba, Alagadiço Novo/José de Alencar, Benfica, Porangabuçu and Praia de Iracema. Properties of conservation interest. The architectural heritage of Fortaleza in the form of fallen goods, however, is predominantly concentrated in the center of the city. The Mucuripe Lighthouse is unfortunately in ruins today, Ceará and Fortaleza were part of the pioneering group of states and cities to adopt public policies to protect the living intangible heritage of their culture, through the Masters of Culture program.

Museums, theatres and cultural spaces

Among the theaters, the largest and most popular are Theatro José de Alencar, São José Theater, São Luiz Cinema Theater, and Teatro RioMarand Teatro Via Sul. The Ceará Museum houses numerous artifacts, including pieces of paleontology and furniture. The Dragão do Mar Center of Art and Culture is the main cultural centre, and includes the Ceará Museum of Culture, the Museum of Contemporary Art of Ceará, theaters, a planetarium, cinemas, shops and spaces for public presentations, as well as housing the Public Library Governador Menezes Pimentel, Oporto Iracema of the Arts and the School of Arts and Crafts Thomaz Pompeu Sobrinho. The Casa de Jose Alencar is one of the Brazilian museums recognised as dealing with Brazilian literature. It was opened in 1964 and houses art collections, a gallery, a library and the ruins of the first steam power plant in Ceará. In the different SERs of the city, the complexes of the CUCA Network are spread, which are facilities dedicated to art, leisure and education, especially for young people.

Freemasonry is represented by the Grand Masonic Lodge of Ceará and the Great State East of Ceará. There are also service clubs in the city, such as the Lions Club and Rotary International.

The Ceará handicraft has its main market and showcase in Fortaleza. In the city, there are several specific places for trade in handicraft products, such as the Ceará Craft Center (CeArt), Ceará Tourism Center (Emcetur), Crafts Fair of Beira-Mar, and on Avenida Monsenhor Tabosa.

Literature and cinema

The main literary manifestation of Fortaleza's history emerged at the end of the 19th century, in the cafes of Praça do Ferreira, known as the Spiritual Bakery, a pioneer in the dissemination of modern ideas in Brazilian literature that would only be adopted nationally in the following century, in the Modern Art Week. The most important historical entities of high culture still present in the city are the Ceará Institute and the Ceará Academy of Letters, the first academy of letters created in Brazil, founded in 1887 and 1894 respectively. The Ceará Institute has helped launch important names in national historiography and philosophy, such as Farias Brito and Capistrano de Abreu. Among the writers who are members of the Cearense Academy of Letters and members or patrons of the Brazilian Academy of Letters, are Gustavo Barroso, Araripe Júnior, José de Alencar, Heráclito Graça, Franklin Tavora, Clóvis Beviláqua and Rachel de Queiroz, the first woman to Be part of the entity. The Casa de Juvenal Galeno is another historical cultural institution of Fortaleza, named after one of the greatest poets born in the city, Juvenal Galeno. The house became well known for its festivals of poetry and seminaries.

In cinema, the most well known name is Zelito Viana, director of films like Villa-Lobos: A Life of Passion and Life and Death of Severina. More recently, Karim Aïnouz has directed Madame Satã, Suely in the Sky and Futuro Beach, and script of Lower City, Cinema, Aspirins and Vultures and Behind the Sun. Another current exponent of cinema born in Fortaleza is Halder Gomes, director and screenwriter of Holliúdy Cinema. New filmmakers in the city have gained in recent years prominent exhibitions such as at the Rio de Janeiro International Film Festival. The most traditional cinema event in Fortaleza is the Cine Ceará (Ibero-American Film Festival), considered one of the main festivals of the country.

Fashion

There are major events in the city, such as the Dragão Fashion Brasil, considered the largest fashion event in the Northeast and the third largest in the country.

Much of the clothing that is produced in Ceará flows through Fortaleza, which in turn is recognized as one of the most important textile centers of the country, giving the garment industry great weight in the metropolitan economy. Brands of the city like Santana Textiles and headquarters of brands like Esplanada and Otoch have considerable regional influence.

Music

Forró is the most popular musical genre in the city. Bands originating in Fortaleza, such as Mastruz com Leite and Aviões do Forró, were responsible for the popularization of electronic forró, which promoted the revaluation of the accordion in the genre and brought it closer to pop music. The forró pé-de serra, however, still holds great cultural influence and commercial prominence in the city.

In Música popular brasileira, some of the names from Fortaleza were Fagner, Ednardo, Belchior (from Sobral but lived in Fortaleza) and Amelinha. The musical tradition of Fortaleza, however, goes back to the composer Alberto Nepomuceno, one of the greatest names in classical music in Brazil, a pioneer in the development of the country's musical nationalism, and therefore considered the "founder of Brazilian music". The Alberto Nepomuceno Conservatory is one of the city's leading music schools.

Carnival
Fortaleza hosts one of the noted Brazilian Carnivals. Its main locations are Iracema Beach and Avenue Domingos Olimpio.

Cuisine

The gastronomy of Fortaleza is very close to the typical Northeastern cuisine, and, traditional include the baião de dois, usually accompanied by barbecue of mutton or meat of sun, and tapioca which is a pancake made from the starch of cassava. The seafood is another ingredient of typical dishes of fortalezeense cuisine, such as the steak moqueca and the mackerel and snapper fish.

The fruit of the sea identity of the coast of the state is the crab. Shrimp and lobster are also widely used delicacies in dishes such as shrimp rice or shrimp dumplings.

Tourism

Acquario Ceará, due to be one of the largest oceanariums in Brazil, is currently under construction. Attractions such as the Beach Park theme park, located in the Great Fortaleza, Avenida Beira Mar and its bars, restaurants and music clubs, the beaches of Futuro and Iracema and Pirata Bar have placed Fortaleza among the Brazilian destinations preferred by Europeans.

Scuba diving is possible in the area of Pedra da Risca do Meio Marine State Park, a marine protected area located about 10 nautical miles from the shoreline of Fortaleza.

Mucuripe is the place where jangadas can be found. Still used by fishermen to go into high seas, jangadas can be seen along the way during the afternoon and evenings, and returning from the sea in the morning; part of the catch of the day is sold in an old-style fish market.

Education

In 2010, the level of the education factor of the Strengthening Human Development Index was medium, despite its great advance, which went from 0.367 to 0.695 between 1991 and 2010. According to data from the 2010 Human Development Atlas of Brazil, Fortaleza's adult education levels were divided as follows: 8.57% did not complete primary school or were illiterate, 62.43% had completed elementary education, 45.93% had completed high school and 13.73% had completed higher education.

Health

The health indexes of the Fortaleza population are better than the Brazilian average. According to data from 2010, the infant mortality rate up to one year old was 15.8 per 1000 live births in Fortaleza, against a Brazilian average of 16.7. By 2013, 90.6% of children under one year of age had their immunization records up to date. In 2012, 37,577 live births were registered, and the infant mortality rate up to five years of age was 13.2 per 1000. Of the total number of children under two years old weighed by the Family Health Program in 2013, 0.8% were malnourished.

In 2009, Fortaleza had a total of 35 general hospitals, of which 11 were public, 21 were private, two were philanthropic, and one was a trade union. The Doctor José Frota Institute is the largest hospital administered by the Municipal Government, and the General Hospital of Fortaleza is the largest hospital administered by the State Government. In addition, it had 54 specialized hospitals and eight polyclinics. The total number of physicians working in the health network of the municipality was 13,604, approximately 5.4 per thousand inhabitants.  Fortaleza has 117 units of health posts, three  administered by the municipality and six administered by the state. The first hospital built in Fortaleza was the Santa Casa de Misericórdia, founded in 1861. Among the most important public health institutions in the city, the most important is the Dr. José Frota Institute, the largest hospital administered by the Municipal Government, and the General Hospital of Fortaleza, the largest hospital administered by the State Government. Among the private institutions, the largest are the Unimed Fortaleza Regional Hospital, Antônio Prudente Hospital, Monte Klinikum Hospital and São Mateus Hospital.

One of the most important basic health programs in Fortaleza is the Family Health Program, within which the city is in third place in the country in extension of coverage, with hundreds of teams distributed in dozens of care units. The Emergency Mobile Care Service (SAMU) is the municipality's health care service, which serves an average of 200 daily occurrences.

The University Hospital Walter Cantídio is the largest liver transplantation facility in the country. The Faculty of Medicine of the UFC is the 13th best medical school in Brazil, 2nd best medical school in the North and Northeast regions and the best medical school in Ceará. UFC's medical degree is still one of the most popular in the country.

Transportation

International Airport

The current passenger terminal of Pinto Martins – Fortaleza International Airport, located in the center of Fortaleza, was built between 1996 and 1998. The airport is now undergoing an expansion process, from which the number of boarding bridges will increase from seven to sixteen and the passenger terminal will be expanded from 38,000 m2 to 133,000 m2. In 2014, the airport was capable of serving 6.2 million passengers per year, but after expansion, capacity would be 11.2 million.

Pinto Martins Airport is the third busiest airport in the Northeast Region and one of the busiest in the country, receiving on average 1,500 international aircraft and 65,000 domestic aircraft per year. In 2013, it received more than 5.9 million passengers.

Air Force Base
Fortaleza Air Force Base - BAFZ, a base of the Brazilian Air Force, is located in Fortaleza.

Roads

In 2013, Fortaleza had 908,074 vehicles, of which 511,109 were cars, and 229 154 motorcycles. Traffic density at peak times in the city is rated as the fourth largest in the country, with 48% of congested roads. The cycle network of Fortaleza is composed of 116.4 km, of which 78.8 km are cycle paths and 37.6 km are cycle paths. The municipality also has a public bicycle system, Bicicletar, which had 40 stations and 400 units in April 2015. In 2015, the municipal taxi fleet was composed of 4 886 vehicles, including common, adapted and special use vehicles.

The city's road transport system is regulated by the Fortaleza Urban Transportation Company (ETUFOR), an agency of the Municipality of Fortaleza. The collective transport carried out by buses is called the Integrated Transportation System (SIT-FOR), and its operation began in 1992.

Subway

The Fortaleza Metro comprises five lines.

The Fortaleza Metro started on October 1, 2014. As of 2014 18 of the 20 stations planned for the South Line are in operation, along with 9 stations of the West Line.

MetroFor is the  rapid transit system for the city of Fortaleza.

Bus stations
Fortaleza has multiple Bus Rapid Transit, or BRT, lines throughout the city and has plans to extend this network of transportation (BRTBrasil.org)

Bike lanes
Fortaleza officially has  of bike lanes.

Sports

The main games of the Ceará State Championship are played in Fortaleza. There are several association football clubs in the city, including Ceará SC, Fortaleza EC and Ferroviário AC. Fortaleza was one of the host cities of the 2013 FIFA Confederations Cup and 2014 FIFA World Cup.

Official Subdivision

Fortaleza is subdivided in 121 neighborhoods, that are grouped in 39 administrative territories, managed by 12 subprefectures (Secreterias Executivas Regionais). Each subprefecture have a holder appointed by the municipal government.

Neighborhoods
 
Dom Lustosa
Parangaba
Pirambu
Praia de Iracema
Rodolfo Teófilo

Notable people

 José de Alencar, famous writer from the 19th century
 Alberto Nepomuceno, famous composer from the 19th century
 Rachel de Queiroz, first female writer in Academia Brasileira de Letras
 André Diamant, international chess grandmaster
 Casimiro Montenegro Filho, founder of the Brazilian Air Force Aeronautical Technologic Institute - ITA
 Maurício Peixoto, mathematician, one of the founders of IMPA
 Gilberto Câmara, former director of Brazil's National Institute for Space Research (INPE)
 Hélder Câmara, Roman Catholic Archbishop nominated for the Nobel Peace Prize
 Castelo Branco, former president (1964–67)
 Karim Aïnouz, film director
 Ed Lincoln, musician and composer
 Shelda Bede, beach volleyball player and olympic medalist
 Raffael, professional footballer
 Ronny Araújo, professional footballer
 Mário Jardel, retired professional footballer
 José Gerardo Moreira Rocha Júnior, footballer
 Otávio Dutra, professional footballer
 Marcus Aurélio, mixed martial arts professional
 Wilson Gouveia, mixed martial arts professional
 Thiago Alves, mixed martial arts professional
 Hermes França, mixed martial arts professional
 Jorge Gurgel, mixed martial arts professional
 Heloneida Studart, writer, politician, women's rights advocate
 Jerônimo Moscardo, retired diplomat

International relations

Fortaleza is twinned with:

 Ferreira do Alentejo, Portugal
 Lisbon, Portugal
 Miami Beach, United States
 Montese, Italy
 Praia, Cape Verde
 Racine, United States
 Sal, Cape Verde

See also
 Housing in Fortaleza, Brazil

References

Bibliography

External links

 Fortaleza City Council home page
 Fortaleza Tourism Office home page

 
Port cities in Brazil
Populated places established in 1726
1726 establishments in the Portuguese Empire
1726 establishments in South America
Municipalities in Ceará